The apex is the highest point of something. The word may also refer to:

Arts and media

Fictional entities
 Apex (comics), a teenaged super villainess in the Marvel Universe
 Ape-X, a super-intelligent ape in the Squadron Supreme universe
Apex, a genetically engineered human population in the TV series The Crossing

Music

 Apex (album), by Canadian heavy metal band Unleash the Archers
 Apex (band), a Polish heavy metal band
 Apex (musician) (1981–2017), British drum and bass music producer and DJ
 The Apex Theory, the former name of the alternative rock band Mt. Helium
Lord Apex, a rapper from West London, UK

Video games
 Apex (tournament), a fighting game tournament focusing on Super Smash Bros.
 APEX (video game), a 2003 video game for the Xbox
 Overwatch Apex, a South Korean Overwatch tournament series
 Apex Legends, a 2019 video game developed by Respawn Entertainment and published by Electronic Arts

Other media
 A.P.E.X., a 1994 science fiction film
 Apex (film), an American action film starring Bruce Willis
 Apex (Ramez Naam novel), a 2015 cyber-punk novel
 Apex Magazine, an American horror and science fiction magazine
 APEX: The Story of the Hypercar, a 2015 American documentary

Organizations

For-profit businesses
 APEX Airlines, a charter and scheduled airline based in Yangon, Myanmar
 Apex Digital, a California-based electronics manufacturer
 Apex Hotels, a UK operator of four star hotels
 Apex Records (Canada), a record label of Compo Company
 Apex Silver Mines, a US-American mining company
 Apex Stores, a Rhode Island-based department store chain
 Apex Studios, a recording studio in Manhattan, New York City
 Apple Productivity Experience Group, an operating unit of Microsoft developing software for Apple products

Other organizations
 Apex (altitude physiology expeditions), a high altitude medical research charity
 Apex (gang), an unstructured criminal gang in Melbourne, Australia
 Apex Clubs of Australia, an association of young individuals
 Applied Physics Express, a scientific peer-reviewed journal
 Association of Professional, Executive, Clerical and Computer Staff, a British Trade Union

Places
 Apex, Arizona
 Apex, Missouri, community in the United States
 Apex, North Carolina, town in the United States
 Apex, Nunavut, community in Canada
 Apex Park and Recreation District, in Colorado
 Apex Mountain Resort, a ski resort near Penticton, British Columbia, Canada
 Apex Town Hall (historic), Apex, North Carolina

Science and mathematics

Anatomy
 Apex (entomology), the anterior corner of a butterfly's wing
 Apex (mollusc), the tip of the spire of the shell of a gastropod
 Apex, the apical meristem or its remnant on a flower
 Apex of the root of a tooth, the tip or extreme end of a root
 Apex (leaf), the tip of a leaf
 Apex of lung, the uppermost portion of lung
 Apex of the heart, the lowest superficial part of the heart
 Apex of the tongue, the tip of the tongue

Mathematics 
 Apex (geometry), the highest vertex in a polyhedron or the point where the two equal sides of an isosceles triangle meet
 Apex graph, a graph that can be made planar by the removal of a single vertex

Other sciences
 Apex predator, a predator at the top of a food chain, with no natural predators
 Solar apex, the direction in which the Solar System travels through the Milky Way
 Acetone peroxide, a highly explosive organic peroxide

Technology

Computing
 Apex (programming language), Java-like proprietary programming language
 Apache Apex, an open-source streaming platform built on top of Hadoop
 Apple Productivity Experience Group, an operating unit of Microsoft developing software for Apple products
 Oracle Application Express, a proprietary Oracle software development system
 BrailleNote Apex, a personal digital assistant for the blind
 Apex, a game engine created by Avalanche Studios

Other technologies
 Apex (racing), the point a car should touch on the inside of a turn when following a proper line
 Apex (radio band), an experimental very high frequency radio broadcasting system
 Additive System of Photographic Exposure, a system of exposure calculation based on Ev units, or stops
 Advanced Photovoltaic Experiment, a scientific research satellite
 Atacama Pathfinder Experiment, a radio telescope operated by the European Southern Observatory
 R-23 (missile), an air-to-air missile (NATO reporting name "Apex")

Other uses
 Apex (diacritic), a sign used by the Romans to mark long vowels
 Apex (typography), an upward pointing shape in certain letters
 Apex (headdress), a cap worn in ancient Rome
 , a Panamanian cargo ship in service 1958–68

See also
 Apical (disambiguation)
 Aphex (disambiguation)